The 1976 Baltimore Colts season was the 24th season for the team in the National Football League. Led by second-year head coach Ted Marchibroda, the Colts finished with a record of 11 wins and 3 losses, tied for first in the AFC East division with the New England Patriots. Baltimore won the AFC East title based on a better division record (7–1 to Patriots' 6–2).

Marchibroda, the reigning NFL coach of the year, resigned a week before the regular season opener, due to a power struggle with general manager Joe Thomas and owner Robert Irsay. Baltimore had won its first two preseason games, then dropped the final four. Several Colts assistant coaches threatened to leave the team, and quarterback Bert Jones publicly came to his coach's defense. Thomas and Irsay quickly made amends with the coach before the season started. (Thomas would be fired by the team shortly after the season.)

The Colts offense was dominant in 1976: they led the league in scoring with 417 points (29.7 per game). Jones was named league MVP after passing for a league-best 3,104 yards, 9.27 yards-per-attempt, and a passer rating of 102.5, second best in the NFL. Running back Lydell Mitchell also had a spectacular year, rushing for 1,200 yards, and catching 60 passes. Wide receiver Roger Carr proved to be a valuable deep threat in the passing game, leading the league with 1,112 receiving yards and 25.9 yards per reception. All three offensive players made the Pro Bowl team.

Offseason

Draft

Personnel

Staff/Coaches

Final roster

Regular season

Schedule

Game summaries

Week 6

Standings

Postseason 

The team returned to the playoffs as a No. 2 seed and hosted the Pittsburgh Steelers in the divisional round. The Colts fell behind 26–7 at the half, and lost 40–14. This game is better remembered for the post-game crash of a private plane into an unoccupied section of Memorial Stadium.

See also 
 History of the Indianapolis Colts
 Indianapolis Colts seasons
 Colts–Patriots rivalry

References 

Baltimore Colts
1976
AFC East championship seasons
Baltimore Colts